BiblioTech (or Biblioteca) is derived from the Latin bibliotheca for "library", and may refer to libraries in countries or municipalities with Latin or Spanish-speaking populations, such as:

Brazil
National Library of Brazil

Chile
Biblioteca Nacional de Chile, Santiago

France
Bibliothèque de la Sorbonne

Italy

Biblioteca Ambrosiana, Milan
Biblioteca Estense, library of the dukes of Este in Modena 
Biblioteca Laurentiana, Florence
Biblioteca Marciana, Venice
Biblioteca Nazionale Centrale di Roma, Rome
Biblioteca Nazionale Vittorio Emanuele III, Naples
 Vatican Library in Italy

Mexico
Biblioteca Palafoxiana, Puebla
National Library of Mexico, Mexico City

Portugal
Biblioteca Nacional de Portugal, Lisbon

Spain
Biblioteca Nacional de España, Madrid
Biblioteca Virtual Miguel de Cervantes, University of Alicante, a digital library

United States
BiblioTech (San Antonio), Bexar County, Texas, a digital library
 Bibliotech (textbooks)
 BiblioTech. Why Libraries Matter More Than Ever in the Age of Google (2015), a book by John Palfrey
BiblioTech Program at Stanford University, Silicon Valley, California, an educational resource